George Waller (1827-1877) was an English recipient of the Victoria Cross. 

George Waller may also refer to:

George Waller (footballer) (1864–1937), English footballer and cricketer
George Waller (judge) (1911–1999), British judge
George Waller (colonel) (1734–1814), American Revolutionary War colonel
George Platt Waller (1889–1962), American diplomat
Sir George Henry Waller, 3rd Baronet (1837–1892), British Army officer
George Waller Jr., author of books such as The Secret of Skull Mountain
George D. Waller (1883–1969), American architect who designed Stone Hall, Nashville